The 1972 United States presidential election in Virginia took place on November 7, 1972. All 50 states and the District of Columbia were part of the 1972 United States presidential election. Virginia voters chose 12 electors to the Electoral College, which selected the president and vice president of the United States.  This was also the first presidential election after the passage of the Twenty-sixth Amendment, which decreased the voting age from 21 to 18.

Virginia was won by incumbent United States President Richard Nixon of California with a landslide 67.84% of the vote, against South Dakota Senator George McGovern of the Democratic Party. Nixon also won the national election with 60.67% of the vote.

In strict accordance with national trends, McGovern carried just one county or independent city in Virginia – however, that county, Charles City County, saw McGovern receive over 67% of the vote, and was his fourth-strongest county in the country. , this constitutes the last occasion the Republican Party has carried Brunswick County, Greensville County, Surry County, Sussex County, and the cities of Charlottesville, Norfolk, Petersburg, Portsmouth and Richmond.

However, Nixon did not win all of the electoral votes in Virginia because one of his pledged electors, Roger MacBride, instead cast his vote for Libertarian candidate John Hospers and his running mate, Tonie Nathan. Although Hospers was not on the ballot in Virginia, MacBride's vote was the first electoral vote ever cast for a female candidate (Nathan); MacBride was subsequently nominated as the Libertarian candidate for President in the next election. This was the first ever occasion where Franklin County and Nelson County voted Republican.

Results

Results by county

Notes

References

1972
1972 Virginia elections
Virginia